Lara Prescott is an American author of fiction. Her debut novel, The Secrets We Kept, was a New York Times bestseller, and Reese Witherspoon Book Club pick. It has been translated into over 30 languages and is being adapted for television.

Early life and education 
Prescott was born and raised in Greensburg, Pennsylvania. She graduated from Greensburg Central Catholic High School in 2000 and attended American University in Washington, D.C., where she studied political science. She earned a Master of Fine Arts (MFA) degree at the Michener Center for Writers at the University of Texas at Austin.

Career 
Before becoming a writer, Prescott worked as a political campaign consultant. She worked as a digital communications consultant and ghost writer for progressive politicians.

In 2019, Prescott's debut novel, The Secrets We Kept, was published by the Alfred A. Knopf imprint of Penguin Random House after a bidding war between publishers was ended by a $2 million deal. It is a fictionalized account of the writing and CIA's clandestine distribution of Doctor Zhivago by Boris Pasternak during the Cold War. The Los Angeles Review of Books compared it to classic Russian literature: “Lara Prescott’s debut follows in the footsteps of classic Russian novels by being an epic love story that is both brilliant and bleak, one that is wound into the fabric of tragic, true history…I can’t stop thinking about this book. Prescott has uncovered a time when people—normal people—risked their lives and careers for literature. Why don’t we see that today?” The New York Times called it a "gorgeous and romantic feast of a novel" and Vogue called it a "stunning spycraft debut."

British author Anna Pasternak sued Prescott in 2019 claiming infringement in her book, Lara: The Untold Love Story and the Inspiration for Doctor Zhivago. Penguin Random House defended Prescott, saying the claims were "simply without merit." In 2022, Pasternak lost the case, with the judge saying it was "extraordinary" that she brought the claim without ever having read The Secrets We Kept and that The Secrets We Kept had not been copied.

References 

American women novelists
21st-century American novelists
Year of birth missing (living people)
Living people
21st-century American women writers
People from Greensburg, Pennsylvania
Novelists from Pennsylvania
American University alumni
Michener Center for Writers alumni